The CsrB RNA is a non-coding RNA that binds to approximately 9 to 10 dimers of the CsrA protein.  The CsrB RNAs contain a conserved motif CAGGXXG that is found in up to 18 copies and has been suggested to bind CsrA. The Csr regulatory system has a strong negative regulatory effect on glycogen biosynthesis, glyconeogenesis and glycogen catabolism and a positive regulatory effect on glycolysis. In other bacteria such as Erwinia carotovora the RsmA protein has been shown to regulate the production of virulence determinants, such extracellular enzymes. RsmA binds to RsmB regulatory RNA which is also a member of this family.

RsmB  RNA was shown to be upregulated by GacS/A system, and increase downstream T3SS gene expression. FlhDC, the master regulator of flagellar genes, also activates rsmB RNA production. A regulatory network have been revealed connecting rsmB, FlhDC and T3SS.

It has been shown to play role in the biocontrol activity of Rahnella aquatilis HX2 (a biocontrol agent producing antibacterial substance).

See also 
 CsrC RNA family
 PrrB/RsmZ RNA family
 RsmY RNA family
 RsmX
 RsmW sRNA
 CsrA protein

References

External links 
 
 Pfam page for the CsrA protein family

Non-coding RNA